Vermeij or Vermey is a Dutch toponymic surname. It is a contraction of "van der Meij" and indicates an origin either from the river  or from the town De Meije along it. Notable people with the surname include:

Geerat J. Vermeij (born 1946), Dutch-born American paleontologist
Marco Vermey (born 1965), Dutch  racing cyclist
Roos Vermeij (born 1968), Dutch politician
Vincent Vermeij (born 1994), Dutch football forward

See also
Vermeyen, Dutch surname of the same origin
Van der Meijden, Dutch surname of the same origin
Kim-Lian van der Meij (born 1980), Dutch musical actress

References

Dutch-language surnames
Toponymic surnames